The Sentinels are a group of mutant-hunting robots appearing in American comic books published by Marvel Comics. They are typically depicted as antagonists to the X-Men.

The Sentinels played a large role in the 1990s X-Men animated series and have been featured in several X-Men video games. The Sentinels are featured prominently in the 2014 film X-Men: Days of Future Past while simulated versions made brief appearances in the 2006 film X-Men: The Last Stand and the 2016 film X-Men: Apocalypse. In 2009, The Sentinels were ranked as IGNs 38th Greatest Comic Book Villain of All Time.

Publication history

Created by Stan Lee and Jack Kirby, they first appeared in The X-Men #14 (Nov. 1965).

Sentinels are programmed to locate mutants and capture or kill them. Though several types of Sentinels have been introduced, the typical Sentinel is three stories tall, is capable of flight, projects energy blasts, and can detect mutants. Pursuing genocide as the means of dealing with a threat has made the Sentinels an analogy for racial hatred and other negative types of fanaticism in Marvel stories, represent the horrific consequences of humanity's actions based on hate and ignorance, along with a caution of the risks of AI takeover.

Characteristics

Sentinels are designed to hunt mutants. While many are capable of tactical thought, only a handful are self-aware.

Sentinels are technologically advanced, and have exhibited a wide variety of abilities. They are armed (primarily with energy weapons and restraining devices), capable of flight, and can detect mutants at long range. They possess vast physical strength, and their bodies are highly resistant to damage. Some are able to alter their physical forms or re-assemble and reactivate themselves after they have been destroyed.

Some Sentinel variants have the ability to learn from their experiences, developing their defenses during an engagement. Several groups of Sentinels have been created and/or led by a single massive Sentinel called Master Mold. Some Sentinels are also equipped with an inconspicuous logic loop in case they should go rogue to convince them that they are mutants as demonstrated in the Tri-Sentinel.

Because of their power, sophistication, and high mass production, Sentinels are sold on the black market. Entities obtain them—often in poor condition—for their own purposes (not necessarily mutant-related).

During the "Iron Man 2020" event, a Sentinel appears as a member of the A.I. Army.

Types of Sentinels

There are different types of Sentinels that appear in the comics:
 Mark I and Master Mold - Created by Bolivar Trask. First appeared in X-Men #14. Bolivar Trask sacrificed himself to destroy the Master Mold.
 Mark II - Created by Larry Trask. This model was capable of adapting to and counteracting superpowers almost instantly. First appeared in X-Men #57.
No.2, the robotic leader of Larry's Sentinels, later "mutated" with the capability of creating space warps.
 Composite - Created by merging the remaining portions of five Sentinels destroyed by the X-Men and came under control of Ashley Martin. It was destroyed by her when it rebelled against her.
 Mark III - Created by Stephen Lang and Project: Armageddon, secretly funded by Edward Buckman and the Council of the Chosen. Based on incomplete notes of Trask and inferior to Mark II. First appeared in X-Men #98.
 X-Sentinels - Created by Stephen Lang. They are androids who were duplicates of the original X-Men. First appeared in X-Men #99.
 Mark IV - Created by Sebastian Shaw. First appeared in The Uncanny X-Men #151.
 Mark V - Created by Sebastian Shaw for U.S. government's Project Wideawake. First appeared in The New Mutants #2.
 Mark VI - Created by Shaw Industries for Project Wideawake and used by Onslaught. Also incorporated parts of Project Nimrod.
 Mark VII - Created by Shaw Industries. They were experimental and remote controlled.
 Nimrod (later Bastion) - A prototype Super Sentinel that arrived from the "Days of Future Past" timeline and was later reactivated by Reverend William Stryker.
 Project Nimrod - Created by an offshoot of Project Wideawake and was in the experimental stage, Project Nimrod was actually a self-awareness program that Nimrod implanted before its demise into the base's military computer cybernet, the program served as a sleeper virus that awaited the opportunity to access a Sentinel development program so it could use it to re-create Nimrod itself. Cancelled after X-Force interfered. 
 Prime Sentinels - Created by Bastion and Operation: Zero Tolerance. They were at first disabled humans infected with Nano-Sentinel technology at Prospero Clinic under the believe that they were being equipped with cybernetic nanotech implants to replace their lost limbs. Unbeknownst to many of them, they became sleeper agents for Operation: Zero Tolerance, as they would, upon activation by a mutant attack or near the presence of one, transformed into armored beings with powerful weapons systems.

 Omega Prime Sentinels - The second generation of Prime Sentinels. Often simply called Omega Sentinels, their nanotechnology is far afield's in advancement to their brethren. Omega's have an 8 step cycle of transformation they undergo before transmuting from full organic to complete machine entities; which are Infection, Nesting, Replication, Dormancy, Activation, Union, Adaptation and finally Omega. Karima Shapandar is one of them.
 Wild Sentinels - Built in secret by a new Master Mold in Ecuador, activated by Donald Trask III and used by Cassandra Nova. New units are produced based on the currently available resources – salvaged parts, weapons and sometimes even entire vehicles – which give this particular type of Sentinel a very diverse, rag-tag appearance. Due to both this and their design flexibility, a wide variety of different shapes and forms have been observed. The Mega-Sentinels used to destroy Genosha and Nanosentinels both belong to this kind of Sentinel. The technology used in Nano-Sentinels is also employed by Weapon Plus for their artificial evolution experiments and the creation of their Super-Sentinels.
 Mark VIII - Sentinel Squad O*N*E, designed by Stark Enterprises. Unlike other Sentinels, the Mark VIII requires a human pilot.
 T.O. Sentinels - An intended upgrade to the Squad O*N*E sentinels conceived of by director Robert Callahan, who sought to use techno-organic substance to increase the effectiveness of his Sentinel program. Failing in his first attempt he would get a second chance after obtaining the Warlock infected New Mutants to use as experimental fodder for further technoforming augmentation to his Sentinel Squad Armor unit.
 Bio-Sentinels - Human mutant corpse infected by a technological virus created by Kaga, They come with the innate capacity of weaponizing bio-technological apparati such as Brood designed missiles as a means of offense.
 Stark Sentinels - The Stark Sentinels debuted during the AXIS storyline. Under the influence of the Red Skull (who also had erased from him any memory of their construction), Tony Stark created a model of Adamantium constructed Sentinels outfitted with Pym Particle technology with databases withholding knowledge of different super heroes he acquired after the 1st Civil War storyline. When Red Skull became the Red Onslaught, and the Avengers arrived to Genosha to stop him, he deployed the Stark Sentinels.
 Mother Mold - A self-aware and capable of adaptation Master Mold variant head designed to create "Master Molds" which in turn create Sentinels. Built in secrecy near the sun by a human group called Project Orchis which is made up of various members of human organizations such as A.I.M., S.H.I.E.L.D., Hydra, Alpha Flight and others, once coming online, Mother Mold will lead directly to the creation of Nimrod, the ultimate nanotechnological Sentinel form.
 Nimrod the Hunter - Created in the modern era solely from contemporary technology and independent of its time-travelling counterparts by Dr. Alia Gregor on Orchis's Mother Mold

Related mutant-hunting creations

 Tri-Sentinel - A giant-sized, six-armed, three-faced combination of three fairly standard Sentinels (created by Shaw Industries) bonded together by Loki as retribution for losing the "Acts of Vengeance" ploy, and defeated by Spider-Man at the peak of his cosmic (Captain Universe) powers. Later revived by The Life Foundation, only to be destroyed again by Spider-Man and Nova. Mendel Stromm later obtained another one from the bunker of the bankrupt Life Foundation and was later approached by a mysterious benefactor who prepared to give him a Master Mold that specializes in creating Tri-Sentinels.
 Soviet Sentinels - Created by the Soviet Union and later purchased by Cuban government officials.
 Super-Sentinels - Using Nano-Sentinel technology, Weapon Plus created artificially evolved superhumans at The World. Three of the creations were chosen to form the mutant-hunting Super-Sentinels: Huntsman, Fantomex and Ultimaton, who were intended to be presented to the public as superheroes to make the extermination of mutantkind look "like a Saturday morning cartoon".
 Colcord's Sentinels - Some of the Boxbots created by Madison Jeffries (aka Box) to serve the Weapon X Program, run by Malcolm Colcord. In one variation of the Days of Future Past timeline seen in the Weapon X: Days of Future Now limited series, one of the Boxbots evolves into a new Master Mold and a new breed of Sentinels.
 Hardaway - A cyborg created at Camp Hayden, killed by the Mutant Liberation Front, who called himself a Bio-Sentinel.
 X-51 (Machine Man) - Captured by Bastion and "infected" with Prime Sentinel nano-bots which reconfigured and reconstructed his systems thereby giving him similar capabilities to Nimrod, such as adapting to almost any situation and programming that at times forced him to attack mutants. 
 Juston Seyfert's Sentinel: First appearing in Sentinel #1, this is a rebuilt Sentinel (likely a Mark V or Mark VI), reprogrammed to obey Juston Seyfert. Initially, Seyfert controlled the Sentinel by riding on its shoulder; he now has built a cockpit into it. Seyfert and his Sentinel are former members of Avengers Academy and featured in Avengers Arena.
 Sentinaughts - One of the types of sentient robots who live in the free robot city of The Core, Sentinaughts are apparently based on the Sentinel design. They vary in size from roughly human to the large stature of traditional Sentinels.
 Nano-Sentinel - Microscopic sentinel type of tech created by Cassandra Nova and implemented in various ways by other users. Moving within the body and attaching themselves to the brains of humans and mutants alike, turning them into mutant-hating assault drones with no self control. Ready to take down any mutant who so much as looks at them.
 An unknown form of human made sentinels created by Simon Trask using a nanite based Sentinel Tech virus. The victims become anti-mutant activists who later, at Trask's command, are fully transformed into lifeless robotic Sentinels mindlessly following Trask's orders.
 Adamantium Cyborgs - Near-fully mechanical mutant hunter killers refitted by Weapon X with the titular metal as an endoskeleton using sentinel based nanotech. Coming in numerous alphabetical categorical batches, these bionic weapons can shed their skin revealing a murderous automaton with the abilities of various X-Men heroes & villains integrated into them.
 Core/Central Command - A biotech Master Mold variant behind the design parameters of the new Prime Sentinel's.

Other versions
The following are alternative versions of the Sentinels, which appear outside of regular Marvel canon.

Age of Apocalypse
In the Age of Apocalypse timeline, Bolivar Trask created the Sentinels with his wife Moira. These Sentinels are equipped with several body-mounted gun turrets, and their primary directive is to protect humans rather than to hunt mutants. They are capable of cooperating with mutants to further this mission. Later, the Sentinels are adapted by Weapon Omega to serve a reverse purpose, and now aid in the hunting of the human race.

Days of Future Past
In the Days of Future Past timeline, which takes place in an alternate future, the "Omega Sentinels" have advanced technologically and become the de facto rulers of the United States. The most powerful among them is Nimrod.

Hembeck
In the joke comic Fred Hembeck Destroys the Marvel Universe, the X-Men are killed by silent, black, man-sized "Ninja Sentinels".

Here Comes Tomorrow
In the Here Comes Tomorrow future timeline, a Sentinel named Rover is Tom Skylark's companion and protector. After more than 150 years of being active, Rover has become self-aware and, possibly, capable of emotion.

House of M
In the House of M storyline, Magneto is victorious in a mutant/human war. The Sentinels are adapted by Sebastian Shaw, now the director of S.H.I.E.L.D., to serve a reverse purpose, and now aid in the hunting of sapien rebels.

MC2
In the MC2 timeline, Wild Thing encounters a Prime Sentinel that has accidentally been activated by a faulty microwave.

Ronin
In the alternate reality of X-Men: Ronin, the story is played out in Japan. A police unit called "Sentinel Force" designs, builds and pilots the robots. These are aesthetically similar to regular Sentinels, but each is subtly different from the others.

Star Trek
In the comic crossover X-Men/Star Trek: Second Contact, the X-Men work with the crew of the Enterprise-E to battle Kang the Conqueror. An away team composed of Captain Picard, Deanna Troi, Nightcrawler and Colossus encounter an approximation of the "Days of Future Past" timeline, in which the Sentinels have merged with the Borg.

Ultimate Marvel
The Ultimate Marvel version of Sentinels were created by Bolivar Trask, were already in action in the Ultimate X-Men story arc, hunting down and killing mutants on the streets, in a program apparently openly and publicly acknowledged by the U.S. government. Later on, there were also the New Sentinels that were sixty of S.H.I.E.L.D.'s top agents in Sentinel battle armor and they were described to have enough hardware to take on a fleet of the old Sentinel models. A new breed of Sentinel robots, created by Trask under the Fenris twins' orders, was later created. After the events of the Ultimatum Wave, Nimrod Sentinels was deployed to hunt, capture or kill mutants that refused to turn themselves in. William Stryker, Jr., using Sentinel tech, later displayed an ability to summon a fleet of Sentinels after being attacked by the Shroud.

What If?
 In What If... Starring Cannonball's little brother Josh—and his pet Sentinel", shows Josh (who would, in normal continuity, later become Icarus) finding and adopting a Sentinel.
 In "What if... Starring Secret Wars: 25 Years Later", the children of Marvel heroes are teleported back to Earth where, sometime in the last 25 years, a variation of "Days of Future Past" is shown when the group is attacked by Sentinels.
 In "What if... Starring Juggernaut: The Kingdom of Cain", Juggernaut has killed the X-Men, and as a result there is no one to oppose the Sentinels, so the world is ravaged by them until they are destroyed by Juggernaut.

In other media

Television
 A Sentinel appears in a flashback in the Spider-Man and His Amazing Friends episode "A Firestar Is Born".
 The Sentinels appear in X-Men: The Animated Series, voiced by David Fox. Introduced in the first season, this version of the Sentinel program is controlled by Bolivar Trask and Henry Peter Gyrich and was cancelled before being transferred to Genosha, with Master Mold being constructed as the Sentinels' leader/mass-production unit. While the Sentinels were seemingly destroyed by Storm, a possible future depicts them as having taken over the world and successfully putting mutants on the verge of extinction. In the season one finale, Master Mold takes over the Sentinels from Trask and Gyrich's secret U.S. facility in an attempt to kidnap world leaders and replace their brains with computers to bring them under its control. However, Professor X and Magneto join forces to seemingly destroy Master Mold. Following this, the Sentinels and Master Mold make sporadic minor appearances in the fourth season.
 The Sentinels appear in the Spider-Man episode "The Mutant Agenda" as a Danger Room simulation.
 The Sentinels appear in X-Men: Evolution. These versions are much more powerful and heavily armed than their comic book counterparts. A prototype that Trask created and Magneto used to attack the X-Men and reveal mutant existence to the media appears in the episode "Day of Reckoning" Pt. 1, followed by three upgraded models that S.H.I.E.L.D. uses against Apocalypse in  the episode "Uprising". Additionally, Nimrod and a fleet of Sentinels appear in a vision of the future depicted in the series finale "Ascension" Pt. 2.
 The Sentinels appear in Wolverine and the X-Men, voiced by Jim Ward. This version of the Sentinel program consists of Sentinel Prowlers, Mark I Sentinels, unnamed futuristic Sentinels, and Sentinel Hounds, all controlled by Master Mold. Additionally, a reprogrammed Sentinel loosely based on the "Here Comes Tomorrow" incarnation nicknamed "Rover" appears in a self-titled episode as an associate of a future incarnation of the X-Men.
 The Sentinels appear in The Super Hero Squad Show episode "Days, Nights, and Weekends of Future Past! (Six Against Infinity Part 2)", voiced by Tom Kenny. These versions were created in a possible future where the Scarlet Witch became a dictator to defend Super Hero City.
 A Sentinel appears in Marvel Anime: X-Men as a Danger Room simulation.
 A Sentinel appears in the Ultimate Spider-Man episode "Game Over" as a part of Arcade's Madland.
 A Sentinel appears in Marvel Disk Wars: The Avengers.
 The Sentinels appear in The Gifted. These versions are small spider-like robots created by Trask Industries to withstand various forms of hazardous environments and attacks as well as adapt quickly to damage taken. Additionally, a similarly named government agency called Sentinel Services appears throughout the series.

Film

 The Sentinels were originally meant to appear in X-Men (2000). In an early draft written by Andrew Kevin Walker and turned in during June 1994, Henry Gyrich and Bolivar Trask use three 8 feet (2.4 m) tall Sentinels to attack the X-Men. Following several rewrites and new scripts, the Sentinels were eventually dropped from the film.
 A Sentinel appears in X-Men: The Last Stand (2006) as a Danger Room simulation.
 Two variations of the Sentinels appear in X-Men: Days of Future Past (2014). The prototype Mark I Sentinels were designed by Legacy Effects with Digital Domain building digital models based on a full-scale practical model while the future Mark X variants, based on Nimrod Sentinels, were computer graphics made by Moving Picture Company. In the film, the prototypes are said to be built using space-age polymers and are equipped with chest-mounted vent-like structures that grant flight capabilities as well as arm-mounted Gatling guns while the future Sentinels have become smaller, sleeker, and built with adaptive mechanical scales, hands that can reform into blades, and emitters in their heads capable of firing energy beams. This version of the Sentinel program was originally created in the 1970s, with Bolivar Trask experimenting on mutants to accelerate his research, though he found little success in gaining support for his project. After Mystique assassinated Trask in 1973, the U.S. government approved the Sentinel program, captured Mystique, and experimented on her to give the Sentinels the ability to adapt and utilize mutant powers. However, they subsequently target humans due to their potential for having mutant descendants, culminating in a dystopian future where most of humanity and mutant-kind are nearly extinct by 2023. Using Kitty Pryde's new ability to project the minds of others into their past selves, the surviving X-Men project Logan's mind back into his 1973 self to rally Charles Xavier and Erik Lehnsherr's younger selves and avert Trask's assassination. Mystique defeats Lehnsherr, but Xavier and Hank McCoy convince her not to kill Trask, causing the U.S. government to realize that not all mutants are a threat to humanity and abandon the Sentinel program.
 The X-Men: Days of Future Past incarnation of the Mark I Sentinels from make a cameo appearance in X-Men: Apocalypse (2016) as Danger Room simulations.

Video games

 The Sentinels appear in the X-Men arcade game.
 The Sentinels appear in Spider-Man/X-Men: Arcade's Revenge.
 The Sentinels appear as bosses in X-Men: Mutant Apocalypse as part of the Genosha stage.
 The Sentinels appear in X-Men 2: Clone Wars.
 A non-standard 10' tall Sentinel appears as a playable character in X-Men: Children of the Atom.
 A non-standard 10' tall Sentinel appears as a secret assist character in Marvel vs. Capcom: Clash of Super Heroes.
 A non-standard 10' tall Sentinel appears as a playable character in Marvel vs. Capcom 2: New Age of Heroes.
 The Sentinels appear in X-Men: Mutant Academy.
 The Sentinels appear as background characters in X-Men: Mutant Academy 2.
 The Sentinels appear in X-Men: Next Dimension, with a male and female Prime Sentinel available as playable characters.
 The Sentinels appear in X-Men Legends, voiced by Scott MacDonald. This version of the Sentinel program includes regular Sentinels, Sentinel Alpha, a Sentinel Controller, a Sentinel Weapons Platform, and a Sentinel Advanced.
 The Sentinels appear in X-Men Legends II: Rise of Apocalypse.
 The Sentinels appear in X-Men: The Official Game. This version of the Sentinel program includes a small flight-capable model and a walking behemoth.
 The Sentinels appear in X-Men Origins: Wolverine, with a Mark I model appearing as a boss.
 A non-standard 10' tall Sentinel appears as an unlockable playable character in Marvel vs. Capcom 3: Fate of Two Worlds and Ultimate Marvel vs Capcom 3, voiced again by Jim Ward. In its arcade mode ending, it uploads Master Mold's program into Galactus's warship with the intention of killing mutants and humanity via Galactus-inspired Sentinels.
 The Sentinels appear in X-Men Destiny.
 The Sentinels appear in Marvel: Avengers Alliance. This version of the Sentinel program includes several Sentinel models named after the Titans. Additionally, the Brotherhood of Mutants employ M-Series Sentinels while the Hellfire Club hired the Crimson Dynamo to build Sentinels loyal to them.
 The Sentinels appear in Marvel Heroes.
 The Sentinels appear in Deadpool.
 The Sentinels appear in Lego Marvel Super Heroes, voiced by Stephen Stanton. Additionally, a Mini-Sentinel appears as an unlockable playable character.
 A Sentinel appears as a playable character in Marvel: Future Fight.
 The Sentinels appear as playable and non-playable characters in Marvel Contest of Champions.
 The Sentinels appear in Marvel Ultimate Alliance 3: The Black Order, with a Power Stone-enhanced variant known as the Infinity Sentinel serving as a boss. Ultron utilizes them to steal the Infinity Stones from the Avengers and the X-Men until the Sentinels are destroyed by the heroes.
 The Sentinels appear as an unnamed landmark in Fortnite Battle Royale.
 The Sentinels appears in Marvel Snap.

Merchandise
 A Sentinel figure was released in Toybiz's X-Men Classics line.
 A Sentinel "Build-A-Figure", based on the "Here Comes Tomorrow" incarnation, was released in wave ten of the Marvel Legends line.
 Two Sentinel figures  was released in Hasbro's Marvel Universe line.
 Two Sentinel figures and a statue were released in the Marvel Minimates line, with the first figure depicting it fighting Rachel Summers as either Phoenix or Marvel Girl and the second, which is based on its appearance in Marvel vs. Capcom 3: Fate of Two Worlds, fighting Ryu.
 A Sentinel figure was released in Lego's "X-Men vs. the Sentinel" set.
 A twenty-six inch Sentinel figure was announced as part of Hasbro's HasLab crowdfunding releases.

Parodies
 A Sentinel appears in the Robot Chicken episode "Sausage Fest", in which it kills the X-Men, leading to Professor X recruiting the cast of the Police Academy films as replacements. After the Sentinel defeats them, it and Professor X part ways on good terms, agreeing to another fight next week.
 Parodies of the Sentinels appear in the Codename: Kids Next Door episode "Operation S.A.F.E.T.Y." Senator Safely builds giant Safety-bots to prevent children from playing harmful games. However, the main robot captures adults as well because of their potential for harming children and attempts to take over the world, only to be forced to self-destruct by Numbah 4, who believed the robot had injured his little brother despite its protocols and called it out on it.
 A Sentinel parody called the "Sentinent" appears in MAD Magazines parody of the X-Men, the "ECH!-Men".

References

External links

Sentinels at Marvel.com

Villains in animated television series
Characters created by Jack Kirby
Characters created by Stan Lee
Comics characters introduced in 1965
Fictional private military members
Marvel Comics characters with superhuman strength
Marvel Comics film characters
Marvel Comics robots
Marvel Comics supervillains
X-Men supporting characters